William Clements Gwyther (19 September 1866 – 22 February 1940) was an Anglican priest.

He was born in London, son of Frederick George Gwyther and Eliza (nee Beattie), and educated at University College School and Keble College, Oxford and ordained in 1895. After curacies at St Margaret Roath and All Saints' Bristol, he was Chaplain of St Ninian's Cathedral, Perth. He was Rector of St James', Dollar and then  St Mary's Dunkeld after which he was Dean of  St Andrews, Dunkeld and Dunblane from 1938 until his death.

References

1866 births
People from Garioch
People educated at University College School
Alumni of Keble College, Oxford
Scottish Episcopalian priests
Deans of St Andrews, Dunkeld and Dunblane
1940 deaths